A list of notable painters from Slovenia:

A 
Zvest Apollonio
Anton Ažbe

B 
Milko Bambič
Bogdan Borčić

C 
Jože Ciuha

Č 
Anton Čebej
Avgust Černigoj

E 
Josip Egartner

G 
Maksim Gaspari
Ivan Grohar
Herman Gvardjančič

I 
Tjaša Iris

J 
Stane Jagodič 
Božidar Jakac 
Rihard Jakopič 
Matija Jama 
Jernej of Loka

K 
Franz Caucig
Irena Kazazić
Ivana Kobilca
Anton Gojmir Kos
Tone Kralj

L 
Lojze Logar

M 
Adriana Maraž
France Mihelič
Zoran Mušič
Marko Modic

P 
Slobodan Pejić
Slavko Pengov 
Veno Pilon
Štefan Planinc
Marij Pregelj

S 
Maksim Sedej
Evgen Sajovic
Matej Sternen
Michael Stroy

Š 
Rudi Španzel
Ive Šubic

T 
Ambroz Testen
Ante Trstenjak
Marko Tušek
Vinko Tušek
Jožef Tominc

References 

Painter